Thomas Kerr, CMG (1818 – August 1907) was Governor of the Falkland Islands from 1880 to 1891.

References 

1818 births
1907 deaths
Governors of the Falkland Islands
Place of birth missing
Companions of the Order of St Michael and St George